The Carrothers Secondary—named for an unincorporated village through which it once passed—is a railway line that is currently owned by CSX Transportation. This line, constructed in the early 1870s, was formerly a portion of the  Pennsylvania Railroad's branch line from the company's Pittsburgh, Fort Wayne and Chicago Railway main line (near Mansfield) to Toledo, Ohio; and, several decades later, Detroit, Michigan. The Toledo to Woodville line was one of the Conrail lines that was originally transferred to CSX circa 1999. PRR abandoned the Carrothers–Mansfield segment in 1959; Conrail abandoned the Tiffin–Carrothers segment in 1984; the SST Port Authority purchased the Woodville to Tiffin line from Conrail circa 1990 and contracted the Indiana Hi-Rail Corp to operate it up until the IHRC bankruptcy.

Rail infrastructure in Ohio
Rail infrastructure in Michigan